Andrey Nikolayevich Tikhonov (17 October 1906 – 7 October 1993) was a leading Soviet Russian  mathematician and geophysicist known for important contributions to topology, functional analysis, mathematical physics, and ill-posed problems. He was also one of the inventors of the magnetotellurics method in geophysics. Other transliterations of his surname include "Tychonoff", "Tychonov", "Tihonov", "Tichonov."

Biography 
Born in Gzhatsk, he studied at the Moscow State University where he received a Ph.D. in 1927 under the direction of Pavel Sergeevich Alexandrov. In 1933 he was appointed as a professor at Moscow State University. He became a corresponding member of the USSR Academy of Sciences on 29 January 1939 and a full member of the USSR Academy of Sciences on 1 July 1966.

Research work 
Tikhonov worked in a number of different fields in mathematics. He made important contributions to topology, functional analysis, mathematical physics, and certain classes of ill-posed problems. Tikhonov regularization, one of the most widely used methods to solve ill-posed inverse problems, is named in his honor.  He is best known for his work on topology, including the metrization theorem he proved in 1926, and the Tychonoff's theorem, which states that every product of arbitrarily many compact topological spaces is again compact. In his honor, completely regular topological spaces are also named Tychonoff spaces.

In mathematical physics, he proved the fundamental uniqueness theorems for the heat equation and studied Volterra integral equations.

He founded the theory of asymptotic analysis for differential equations with small parameter in the leading derivative.

Organizer work 
Tikhonov played the leading role in founding the Faculty of Computational Mathematics and Cybernetics of Moscow State University and served as its first dean during the period of 1970–1990.

Awards 
Tikhonov received numerous honors and awards for his work, including the Lenin Prize (1966) and the Hero of Socialist Labor (1954, 1986).

Publications

Books
 A.G. Sveshnikov,  A.N. Tikhonov,  The Theory of Functions of a Complex Variable, Mir Publishers, English translation, 1978.
 A.N. Tikhonov, V.Y. Arsenin, Solutions of Ill-Posed Problems, Winston, New York, 1977. .
 A.N. Tikhonov, A.V. Goncharsky, Ill-posed Problems in the Natural Sciences, Oxford University Press, Oxford, 1987. .
 
 A.N. Tikhonov, A.V. Goncharsky, V.V. Stepanov, A.G. Yagola, Numerical Methods for the Solution of Ill-Posed Problems, Kluwer, Dordrecht, 1995. .
 A.N. Tikhonov, A.S. Leonov, A.G. Yagola. Nonlinear Ill-Posed Problems, Chapman and Hall, London, Weinheim, New York, Tokyo, Melbourne, Madras, V. 1–2, 1998. .

Papers

See also

Regularization
Stone–Čech compactification
Tikhonov cube
Tikhonov distribution
Tikhonov plank
Tikhonov space
Tikhonov's theorem on dynamical systems

References

External links

1906 births
1993 deaths
Soviet mathematicians
Topologists
Full Members of the USSR Academy of Sciences
Full Members of the Russian Academy of Sciences
Moscow State University alumni
Heroes of Socialist Labour
Members of the German Academy of Sciences at Berlin
Soviet inventors
Academic staff of Moscow State University